Killjoy may refer to:

Characters
 Killjoy, in Charlton Comics' E-Man series
 Killjoy, in the video game Valorant
 Killjoy, in the Marvel Comics series Weapon P.R.I.M.E.
 Killjoy, in the movie The Ice Pirates
 Dr. Killjoy, in the video game The Suffering
 Katie Killjoy, in the adult animated series Hazbin Hotel

Film and television
 Killjoy, a 1981 made-for-television movie starring Kim Basinger
 Killjoy (2000 film), a horror film about the killer clown, Killjoy
 Killjoy (film series)
 Killjoy 2: Deliverance from Evil, a 2002 sequel
 Killjoy 3, a 2010 sequel
 Killjoys, a 2015 science fiction television series

Music
 Killjoy (musician) (1969–2018), American vocalist
 The Killjoys (Australian band), a 1980s Australian pop-folk band
 The Killjoys (Canadian band), a 1990s Canadian alternative rock band
 The Killjoys (UK band), late 1970s UK punk rock/new wave band
 Killjoy (Shihad album), 1995
 "The Killjoy", a song by Insomnium from the album Above the Weeping World
 "Mr. Killjoy", a song by Lordi from the special edition of the album The Arockalypse
 Killjoy (Fox Stevenson album), 2019

Novels
 Killjoy, a 2002 novel by Julie Garwood
 (Our Sister) Killjoy, a 1977 novel by Ama Ata Aidoo

Other
 Killjoy, the NATO reporting name of the Kh-47M2 Kinzhal missile

See also